Mian is a surname, and can also be used as a given name.

Notable people with the given name include:

 Mian Mir, a Sufi saint of Punjab region (India and Pakistan)
 Mian Muhammad Bakhsh, a Sufi saint and poet of Punjab
 Mian Hayaud Din, a major general of Pakistan
 Mian Iftikharuddin, a Pakistani leftist leader
 Ajmal Mian, Chief Justice of the Supreme Court of Pakistan
 Aziz Mian, noted Pakistani singer (Qawwal)
 Emran Mian, a British Pakistani author
 Li Mian, a general of the Chinese Tang Dynasty
 Mian Mian, a Chinese writer
 Michele Mian, an Italian basketball shooting guard
 Muhammad Mian Soomro, a politician and former Chairman of the Senate of Pakistan
 Pei Mian, an official of the Chinese Tang Dynasty
 Salahuddin Mian, the first ceramic artist of Pakistan
 Wang Mian, a Chinese painter of plums during the Yuan Dynasty
 Xu Mian, an official of the Chinese Liang Dynasty
 Nawaz Sharif (Mian Nawaz Sharif), ex-prime minister of Pakistan
 Mian Shahbaz Sharif, chief minister of Punjab, Pakistan